V •••– is the fifth studio album from American psychobilly band Tiger Army, released May 20, 2016 on Luna Tone Records/Rise Records. On February 26, 2016, "Prisoner of the Night", the first single from the album, was released on iTunes. Like the first three full-length albums, V •••– contains 13 tracks.

In an interview with the website Noisey, singer and guitarist Nick 13 called the album, "...a pretty significant leap forward for us—it's an evolution in the sound."

Background
In June 2014, Nick 13 announced that writing for a new Tiger Army album was underway via the band's Facebook page. Recording of this album, the band's fifth, was announced to have commenced in March 2015. In October 2015, the band posted the first preview of music from the new album on their Instagram page, a 15-second clip of the song "Prisoner of the Night". On February 26, 2016, "Prisoner of the Night" was released in full on iTunes.

Track listing

All tracks composed by Nick 13

Personnel
 Greg Calbi – Mastering
 Casey Curry – Photography
 Keith Douglas – Trumpet
 Mike Fasano – Drum Technician
 Linas Garsys – Artwork
 Ben Grey – Vocals
 Ted Hutt – Claves,  Guitar (Acoustic),  Mixing,  Producer,  Shaker,  Tambourine
 Greg Kuhn – Keyboards
 Savitri Labensart – Vocals
 Curtis Laur – Guitar Technician
 Greg Leisz – Pedal Steel Guitar
 Sergie Loobkoff – Artwork
 Steve Lu – Clavioline,  Farfisa Organ,  Hammond B3,  Mellotron,  Piano,  String Arrangements,  Strings
 Ryan Mall – Engineer
 Mitch Marine – Drums
 Nick 13 – Composer,  Guitar,  Marxophone,  Vocals
 Jade Puget – Arranger
 Dave Roe – Standup Bass
 Jim Spake – Saxophone

Charts

References 

Tiger Army albums
2016 albums
Rise Records albums